Rotokauri is a semi-rural suburb split between western Hamilton and Waikato District in New Zealand. It is one of the future urban zones of Hamilton, along with Peacocke. The northeastern parts of Rotokauri, within Hamilton, are sometimes called Burbush and Baverstock. Part of Rotokauri was taken into Hamilton with the 10th city extension in November 1989. Until then it had been in the Waipa County Council area.

The outskirts of Rotokauri have an impressive orchid farm, all under glass, exporting blooms across the world, and providing ample local employment.

Prior to the 1863 invasion of the Waikato the area was occupied by Ngāti Koura, Ngāti Ruru and Ngāti Ngamurikaitaua, all being Tainui hapū.

Demographics

Rotokauri had a population of 1,563 at the 2018 New Zealand census, an increase of 318 people (25.5%) since the 2013 census, and an increase of 447 people (40.1%) since the 2006 census. There were 501 households, comprising 798 males and 771 females, giving a sex ratio of 1.04 males per female, with 321 people (20.5%) aged under 15 years, 300 (19.2%) aged 15 to 29, 747 (47.8%) aged 30 to 64, and 201 (12.9%) aged 65 or older.

Ethnicities were 84.8% European/Pākehā, 12.7% Māori, 1.3% Pacific peoples, 9.0% Asian, and 1.9% other ethnicities. People may identify with more than one ethnicity.

The percentage of people born overseas was 18.2, compared with 27.1% nationally.

Although some people chose not to answer the census's question about religious affiliation, 48.9% had no religion, 38.6% were Christian, 0.4% had Māori religious beliefs, 1.0% were Hindu, 1.3% were Muslim, 1.0% were Buddhist and 2.3% had other religions.

Of those at least 15 years old, 300 (24.2%) people had a bachelor's or higher degree, and 180 (14.5%) people had no formal qualifications. 345 people (27.8%) earned over $70,000 compared to 17.2% nationally. The employment status of those at least 15 was that 717 (57.7%) people were employed full-time, 189 (15.2%) were part-time, and 24 (1.9%) were unemployed.

Education

The school opened in 1911.

Lakes 

Waiwhakareke, or Horseshoe Lake (neither name is official) is the second largest lake in Hamilton, covering . It is a peat lake in Waiwhakareke Natural Heritage Park,  bought by the City Council in 1975. Like most of Waikato it would have been inundated by a flood of water and ignimbrite debris from Lake Taupō about 22,000 years ago. A peat bog formed in the hollow and restricted drainage. Work to restore the natural qualities of the park began in 2004. The lake drains north into a stream, which feeds Lake Rotokauri.

See also
 List of streets in Hamilton
Suburbs of Hamilton, New Zealand
 Rotokauri Public Transport Hub
 Lake Rotokauri
 Hamilton Zoo

References

Suburbs of Hamilton, New Zealand